Jonker Afrikaner ( 1785, Roode Zand near Tulbagh, South Africa – 18 August 1861, Okahandja) was the fourth Captain of the Orlam in South West Africa, succeeding his father, Jager Afrikaner, in 1823. Soon after becoming Kaptein, he left his father's settlement at Blydeverwacht with three brothers and some 300 followers and relocated to the area that is today central Namibia. From 1825 onwards he and his council played a dominant political role in Damaraland and Namaland, creating a de facto state.

Around 1840, he established a settlement at Windhoek where he built a church for a congregation of between 500 and 600 in the area of the present-day Klein Windhoek suburb. He is further known for his road building activities in central and southern Namibia, particularly the one over the Auas Mountains to the south and the northern Bay Road from Windhoek to Walvis Bay.

Missionary Hugo Hahn estimated in 1852 that the formation Jonker Afrikaner ruled over consisted of 1500 ethnic Oorlams, 2000 Hereros, and 2000 Damaras.

He is the father of Christian Afrikaner who succeeded him as chief of the Orlams in 1861, and Jan Jonker Afrikaner who succeeded Christian in 1863.

References

1785 births
1861 deaths
People from the Cape Winelands District Municipality
Nama people
Namibian politicians
Oorlam people
People from Windhoek
City founders